"Someone Who's Cool" is a song by Canadian rock band Odds. It was released in 1996 as the lead single from the band's fourth album, Nest (1996). The song was originally written for the Friends soundtrack. The song peaked at number two on the Canadian RPM 100 chart and number three on the RPM Alternative 30. The song was used as the theme song to the short-lived CBS music industry comedy Love Monkey.

Music video
The song's music video was directed by Curtis Wehrfritz. The video was nominated for "Best Video" at the 1997 Juno Awards.

Track listings
Canadian and US promo CD
 "Someone Who's Cool" – 3:16

UK and Australian CD single
 "Someone Who's Cool" – 3:16
 "Eat My Brain" – 4:25
 "Wendy Under the Stars" (original version) – 4:01
 "Suppertime" (original version) – 3:47

Charts

Weekly charts

Year-end charts

Release history

References

1996 singles
1996 songs
Elektra Records singles